Héctor Garzó Vicent (born 9 June 1998) is a Spanish motorcycle racer, competing in the MotoE World Cup for Tech3 team.

Career

Moto3 Junior World Championship
Garzó competed in the 2016 FIM CEV Moto3 Junior World Championship without scoring a point.

Moto2 European Championship
Garzó moved to the Moto2 European Championship the following season, and was much more successful, scoring a 2nd place, and three 3rd place finishes in the year, ending the season with 126 points, and fourth in the overall standings.

He would stay for the 2018 season as well, scoring two 3rd places in Aragón, before winning his first race of the category in Albacete. He would score one more podium, a second place in the season closer at Valencia, ending his season third in the championship standings, with 124 points.

In the 2019 season, he would win two races, one each in Aragón and Alabecete, and finished on the second step of the podium six times, ending his final season in the category 2nd overall in the championship standings, with 183 points, 38 points behind Edgar Pons.

Moto2 World Championship

Tech3 Racing (2017–2018)
Garzó made his Moto2 World Championship debut at the 2017 German motorcycle Grand Prix replacing the injured Xavi Vierge, but retired from the race. In the 2018 Moto2 World Championship, he would make a further three appearances replacing the injured Remy Gardner, but failed to score points in any of the three races at Jerez, Le Mans, and Mugello.

Flexbox HP40 (2020–2021)
Garzó would get his first full time Moto2 season in 2020, partnering Lorenzo Baldassarri at Flexbox Pons Racing. Garzó had a decent season, finishing in the top 10 in five races, including his maiden podium in the category, a 2nd place in Valencia. Garzó finished his rookie season with 63 points, 16th in the standings, and second among rookies.

Staying with Flexbox Pons Racing for the 2021 Moto2 World Championship, Garzó would struggle during the year, only scoring one top 10 finish, four point scoring finishes, and was forced to miss two races due to burns suffered in a crash at Catalunya. He was replaced by Alonso López. Garzó finished his disappointing season 23rd in the standings, with 16 points, and was not extended by Pons Racing team for 2022.

MotoE World Championship
Garzó would make his debut in the 2019 MotoE World Cup, riding for Tech3. He had a good season, finishing 4th in Germany, and scoring two 2nd places in the two rounds at Misano. He would end the season well with a 2nd place and a 3rd place in Valencia, but was disqualified from the first Valencia race for having too low pressure in his tyres. This ended his title fight, and he finished the season 4th in the championship, with 69 points.

Following a disappointing 2021 Moto2 season, Tech3 signed Garzó for the 2022 MotoE World Cup.

Career statistics

FIM CEV Moto3 Junior World Championship

Races by year
(key) (Races in bold indicate pole position, races in italics indicate fastest lap)

FIM CEV Moto2 European Championship

Races by year
(key) (Races in bold indicate pole position, races in italics indicate fastest lap)

Career statistics

FIM Moto2 European Championship

Races by year
(key) (Races in bold indicate pole position) (Races in italics indicate fastest lap)

Grand Prix motorcycle racing

By season

By class

Races by year
(key) (Races in bold indicate pole position; races in italics indicate fastest lap)

 Half points awarded as less than two thirds of the race distance (but at least three full laps) was completed.

References

External links

Living people
1998 births
Spanish motorcycle racers
Moto2 World Championship riders
Sportspeople from Valencia
MotoE World Cup riders